Vera Isaakovna Gromova (March 8, 1891 – January 21, 1973) was a Soviet paleontologist known for her studies of fossil ungulates (hoofed mammals). She worked at the Russian Academy of Sciences, where from 1919 to 1942 she was head of osteology, Zoological Museum, and from 1942 to 1960 at the Paleontological Institute , where she was head of mammal laboratory from 1946 onward. Her works include The history of horse (genus Equus) in the Old World (1949) and Fundamentals of Paleontology: Mammals (1968).

References

1891 births
1973 deaths
Soviet paleontologists
Paleontologists from the Russian Empire
Woman scientists from the Russian Empire
Women paleontologists